Fanny Duarte (born 29 May 1992) is a Dominican Republic badminton player.

Achievements

BWF International Challenge/Series 
Women's doubles

  BWF International Challenge tournament
  BWF International Series tournament
  BWF Future Series tournament

References

External links 
 
 

1992 births
Living people
Place of birth missing (living people)
Dominican Republic female badminton players
21st-century Dominican Republic women